"Meet Me at My Funeral" is the second single from the UK rock band Brigade's debut album Lights. It was released 21 August 2006 and reached number four on the UK Rock Chart.

Track listing
"Meet Me at My Funeral"
"Made to Wreck"
"Null and Void"
"Meet Me at My Funeral"
"I Should Wake Up"

2006 singles
Brigade (band) songs
2006 songs